Exxon Corp. v. Exxon Insurance Consultants International Ltd [1982] Ch. 119 is a leading decision in English law on the existence of copyright in a name alone and the infringement of a trade mark. The Court found that typically there is no copyright in a name, invented or otherwise, and that a trade mark can only be infringed when the infringing party shares part of the market segment.

The Plaintiff, Exxon Corp, had claimed the copyright of the word and went on to file an injunction to stop the defendant company from using the word 'Exxon', under Exxon's copyright claim to its own name under English Copyright law, protecting 'original literary works' and further asked the defendant company to remove the word from the company name. However, Judge Oliver decided to not grant the injunction to an infringement of copyright and noted that the word did not qualify for copyright protection as an ′original literary work′. This is because it conveyed no information, provides no instruction nor pleasure and is furthermore merely a combination of letters from the alphabet.

Judge Graham quoted '"if the plaintiffs' argument is right .... the consequences would be far-reaching and probably in many cases objectionable'. On appeal it was further emphasised by Lord Justice Stevenson that 'I am not sure whether this ["Exxon"] can be said to be a "work" at all; I am clearly of the opinion that it cannot be said to be a 'literary work'.

Trade mark
With regard to the trade mark, the Court found that the use of this word by the defendants, who work in a field that in no way shares a market segment with the plaintiff, in no way dilutes the plaintiff's brand name nor infringes on its trade mark.

References

1981 in British law
1981 in case law
Court of Appeal (England and Wales) cases
ExxonMobil litigation
Trademark case law
United Kingdom copyright case law
United Kingdom intellectual property case law